The Madagascar national rugby sevens team is a minor national sevens side.

2006 Hong Kong Sevens

Rugby union in Madagascar
Madagascar national rugby union team
National rugby sevens teams